= Identity Politics (book) =

1989 non-fiction book by Shane Phelan

Identity Politics: Lesbian Feminism and the Limits of Community
- Author: Shane Phelan
- Publisher: Temple University Press
- Publication date: 1989
- Pages: 206
- ISBN: 9780877226512
- OCLC: 19353388

Identity Politics: Lesbian Feminism and the Limits of Community is a non-fiction book by Shane Phelan. It was published in 1989 by Temple University Press.

== Reception ==
Identity Politics, while praised for Phelan's ability to combine her knowledge of philosophical literature and contemporary political analysis, critical response has noted its tendency towards totalizing theories. Likewise, Phelan's assumptions are said to "obscure the ways in which sexual identity is situated within multiple and overlapping social and discursive horizons and across the very terrain of difference and heterogeneity."
